The Last Gentleman is a 1934 American pre-Code comedy film directed by Sidney Lanfield and written by Maude T. Howell, Leonard Praskins and Paul Schofield. The film stars George Arliss, Edna May Oliver, Janet Beecher, Charlotte Henry and Ralph Morgan. The film was released on April 28, 1934, by United Artists.

Plot

Cast
George Arliss as Cabot Barr
Edna May Oliver as Augusta Pritchard
Janet Beecher as Helen Barr
Charlotte Henry as Marjorie Barr
Ralph Morgan as Henry Loring
Edward Ellis as Claude
Frank Albertson as Allan Blaine
Rafaela Ottiano as Retta Barr
Donald Meek as Judd Barr
Joseph Cawthorn as Dr. Wilson
Harry C. Bradley as Prof. Schumaker (uncredited)

References

External links
 

1934 films
American black-and-white films
1930s English-language films
Films directed by Sidney Lanfield
United Artists films
Twentieth Century Pictures films
American comedy films
1934 comedy films
Films produced by Joseph M. Schenck
Films produced by Darryl F. Zanuck
Films scored by Alfred Newman
1930s American films